Uroecobius is a genus of spiders in the family Oecobiidae. It was first described in 1976 by Kullmann & Zimmermann. , it contains only one species, Uroecobius ecribellatus, found in South Africa.

References

Oecobiidae
Monotypic Araneomorphae genera
Spiders of South Africa